Mercer County Community College (MCCC) is a public, community college in Mercer County, New Jersey. More than 7,000 students enroll in one or more credit courses each year.

Established in 1966, MCCC has an open-door admission policy. The  West Windsor Township Campus was opened in 1971 to serve the needs of Mercer County residents. The main buildings on campus feature brutalist architecture, popular in 1960s college campus construction. The continually expanding James Kerney Campus, located in the heart of New Jersey's capital city, Trenton, serves as an educational and cultural hub for urban residents.

MCCC is particularly well known for its student newspaper, athletics, performing arts, and Honors programs all of which have sent students to transfer schools, including R1 and Ivy Leagues. Many athletes have gone onto NCAA Division I schools and major league or professional teams. Notable alumni include Trey Anastasio founder and lead vocalist for Phish, Heath Fillmyer pitcher for the Kansas City Royals, and Kenneth R. Rosen, reporter for The New York Times.

The college offers continuing education classes and more than 60 different degree bearing options from transfer ready Liberal Arts degrees to hands-on offerings such as Automotive Technology and Hospitality. Several programs, such as Funeral Service and Aviation Technology, are the only ones of their kind offered at a public institution in the state of New Jersey. Medical programs such as Nursing and Radiography require application for admission and students must past licensure exams to complete.

As an open enrollment college, the student body of MCCC is known for reflecting the diverse county around it. In terms of racial diversity, it is 37% white, 26% black, and 26% Hispanic, 10% are mixed race, and 4% are international students. The student body is 52.6% female. While 45% of students are in the typical junior college age range of 18–20 years old, there are a significant number of "non-traditional" aged students. More than 8% of students are age 40 and up. MCCC also has a program for students with intellectual disabilities, known as the DREAM program, allowing them to be integrated into mainstream classes with support from mentors through the Academic Student Resources division.

Honors Program
Established in 2006, MCCC's Honors program offers course sections across the curriculum that give academically strong students opportunities for greater challenge. Honors classes feature smaller, seminar-style classes. Students are encouraged to lead discussion and the pace and depth of learning is generally more vigorous than in standard sections. Students participate in annual Honors Conferences. Depending on the number of Honors courses they have completed, students may receive an Honors cord at graduation and recognition on their transcripts. In addition to state schools like Rutgers and The College of New Jersey, Honors Program students are known for gaining admission to other transfer schools.

Performing arts
MCCC has a 385 seat on-campus community performing arts center, Kelsey Theatre, which hosts local production company performances as well as student plays and musicals throughout the year. Typically twenty or more different full length productions are performed per year with additional summer series and a kids program known as Tomato Patch.

The academic Theatre and Dance programs include an Associate of Fine Arts programs for students intending to move directly into performing arts careers, and an Associates of Arts degree track for students seeking transfer to four-year colleges. The Theatre program is also home to the college's Drama Club, which produces Late Night Series, a twice-monthly open-mic night on campus.

In 2019 the student production of “Desires of a Criminal, a Devised Theatrical Collage" was selected to appear at the Kennedy Center American College Theatre Festival (KCACTF).

Student Newspaper 
The College VOICE student newspaper at MCCC is known as one of the top state and national papers in its division. With a staff size that fluctuates from 4 to 15 students per semesters, The VOICE is known for its award-winning investigative reporting and coverage of local news events not being covered as area papers have gone under or faced major staff cuts in the last 15 years.

The paper, originally founded in 1968 and named after the famed Village Voice newspaper in New York, has faced occasional hiatuses, but since 2008 has seen a redevelopment with two new media advisers and expanded connection to the college's journalism classes.

The VOICE earned the General Excellence top award from the New Jersey Press Foundation in 2009, 2010, 2014, 2017, 2018, and 2019. In 2010 The VOICE was named Best All-Around Non-Daily Two Year newspaper in the nation in the Society of Professional Journalists' Mark of Excellence Awards. Since that time the two-year division has been discontinued but The VOICE has gone on to win and place 25 times in the Mark of Excellence Region 1 awards and has earned 6 national finalist awards competing against four-year colleges.

In 2010 The VOICE, which produces print editions every three weeks throughout the academic year, added an online edition that includes breaking news and multimedia content. The website won top honors from the New Jersey Press Foundation in 2018 and 2019.

The VOICE is open to all students on campus and the staff composition mirrors the racial, ethnic, political, sexual, religious, and socio-economic diversity on campus. While most participants are not seeking careers in journalism, many go into writing and communication fields. VOICE alumni have gone on to jobs at media outlets including The New York Times, The Boston Globe, Newsweek Mexico, and NBC 7 San Diego.

DREAM Program
MCCC has a program to offer students with intellectual disabilities access to college education. In 2005 the college received a grant of $150,000 from Steve Riggio, chief executive of Barnes & Noble, to help establish the DREAM (Developing Real Expectations for Achieving Mastery) program. Riggio and wife Laura have two daughters with Down Syndrome. Run by the Academic Student Resources division located on the West Windsor Campus, students in the program are assisted by mentors.

Athletics 
MCCC is a member of the Garden State Athletic Conference and the National Junior College Athletic Association (NJCAA) and plays in Region XIX Division II. Its teams are known as the Mercer Vikings. It fields teams in baseball, men's and women's basketball, women's cross country, men's and women's soccer, softball, men's lacrosse, and men's and women's tennis.

Although MCCC has had strong seasons in all its sports, it is known for strength in soccer, baseball and softball. All three teams, men's soccer, baseball and softball, won Region XIX Division II Championships in the 2017-2018 season. The Vikings have sent several players to the Major League Baseball including Dave Gallagher, and Heath Fillmyer.

In 2018 MCCC added a men's lacrosse team that took the Region XIX championship in its first season of play.

High school connections 
Some high school students can take credit bearing classes at MCCC through one of several programs. Participation is limited to students given permission by their high school and who meet admissions criteria including standardized test scores. These options can enable students to accelerate their college graduation by allowing them to enter their freshman year with advanced academic standing.

There are two concurrent enrollment options, the first being Dual Enrollment which is for high school seniors. The second is Jump Start for students age 16 and up with written recommendation of their guidance counselor and/or legal guardian. Jump Start students have specific GPA standards that must be maintained to stay in the program and they may take no more than two classes per semester, whereas Dual Enrollment students can take more. Students in both programs have to provide their own transportation, pay course fees, and attend consistently based on the college's academic calendar even if it does not correspond to their high school calendar.

Career Prep is another high school program offered in partnership with Mercer County Technical Schools. Students attend their regular school in the morning then go to MCCC for afternoon classes. Students in the Career Prep program take two courses in each term, fall and spring, for a total of 12 credits. The program is open to students with strong GPAs, typically 3.25 or above, from sending public schools, and is designed for those looking for advancement in specific fields including:

Business Foundations
Computer Systems & Networking Technology
Criminal Justice
Dance
Fire Science Technology / Emergency Medical Technology
Landscape Design & Horticulture
Professional Cooking
Radio & Television Production
Theatre/Drama
Vocal Music

University Center 
Five universities offer programs on MCCC's campuses for students having completed their Associate degrees, and who wish to stay on-site to earn their Bachelor's and even Master's degrees. Students who choose to pursue their academic work through the University Center can be assured smooth transfer and pay lower tuition than they would at their university's primary campuses, however, degree options are fewer and many courses are offered online only. In fall of 2018 MCCC broke ground on a new University Center building on the West Windsor, New Jersey campus.

Guaranteed Transfer Admission 
Previously known as the "Dual Admissions" program, the Guaranteed Transfer Admission program consists of specialized transfer agreements guaranteeing admission to specific four-year colleges and universities. Each agreement has slightly different requirements and allowed majors. Students can transfer into the junior year at most New Jersey colleges, including: Rutgers University, Rider University, The College of New Jersey, Montclair State University, the New Jersey Institute of Technology, William Paterson University, Stockton University, and Thomas Edison State College. There are also out of state guaranteed admission programs including ones at Temple University, Wilmington University, University of the Sciences, and James Madison University.

Accreditation
The college is accredited by the Commission on Higher Education of the Middle States Association of Colleges and Schools and is authorized by the State of New Jersey's Commission on Higher Education to award associate degrees. Many academic programs are also accredited by national professional associations and their boards of certification.

The nursing program is accredited by the New Jersey Board of Nursing and the Accreditation Commission for Education in Nursing. The Radiography program is accredited by the Joint Review Committee on Education in Radiologic Technology and approved by the New Jersey Radiologic Technology Board of Examiners. The Medical Laboratory Technology program is accredited by the National Credentialing Agency for Laboratory Personnel. The Physical Therapist Assistant program is fully accredited by the Commission on Accreditation in Physical Therapy Education of the American Physical Therapy Association.

The Legal Assistant program is approved by the American Bar Association. The Funeral Service program is accredited by the American Board of Funeral Service Education. Aviation Flight Technology is accredited by the Aviation Accreditation Board International (formerly the Council on Aviation Accreditation).

MCTV 26
Mercer County Television (MCTV) channel 26 is an Educational-access television station in West Windsor, New Jersey, United States, owned and operated by Mercer County Community College. The Student television station is transmitted to all of Mercer County, New Jersey, via cable TV channel 26 on the Comcast, Cablevision, reaching up to 90,000 households. In January 2009, MCTV became available on Verizon FiOS channel 20 in Mercer County.

WWFM
WWFM: The Classical Network is owned by MCCC and broadcasts on 89.1 MHz (HD Radio) from the West Windsor, New Jersey campus. WWFM-HD2 is "JazzOn2", which runs a traditional Jazz format. WWFM-HD3 is "Viking 89", MCCC student radio. WXPN's XPoNential Radio service airs on the HD3 when Mercer students are not on the air. "JazzOn2" is also on the HD2 channel of WWNJ. WWFM also broadcasts in the Philadelphia market on digital (HD) radio on 89.5 HD2.

The station is known for programs featuring opera, symphonic music, jazz, and musical theater. Well known programs include Between the Keys, PostClassical, The Well Tempered Baroque, and The Dress Circle. The station has won several ASCAP Foundation Deems Taylor/Virgil Thomson Radio Broadcast Award as well as a National Federation of Community Broadcasters Silver Reel Award for the program The Dress Circle.

Clubs and government
MCCC is home to a wide variety of clubs and student activities boards.

Student Government Association
The College VOICE - student newspaper
Rainbow Coalition (LGBTQ+)
Hospitality
Caribbean Vibes
African Students Association
Physical Therapy Assistants
Alpha Mu Gamma
Chess Club
Christian Fellowship
Skaters
Criminal Justice
Drama Club
Future Teachers Club
Go Green Club
International Student Organization
Music Club
Muslim Student Association (MSA)
Phi Beta Lambda
Phi Theta Kappa
Philosophy Club
Programs for Academic Services and Success Club
Viking 89 Radio Station

Notable alumni

Trey Anastasio (born 1964), Founder, lead singer and guitarist for Phish
Heath Fillmyer (born 1994), Major League Baseball pitcher for the Kansas City Royals
Dave Gallagher (born 1960), former Major League Baseball journeyman who played outfield for the Oakland Athletics, the Chicago White Sox, the Los Angeles Angels, the New York Mets, the Philadelphia Phillies, and the Cleveland Indians
 Antron Brown (born 1976), first African American champion drag racer
 Stern John (born 1976), Trinidadian soccer player and manager of Central F.C.
 Daouda Kanté (born 1978), Malian soccer player who played three seasons in Major League Soccer
 Doug Mastriano (born 1964), politician who is a retired Colonel of the United States Army and the state senator for Pennsylvania's 33rd District
 Evans Wise (born 1973), Trinidadian soccer player called up to for the 2006 FIFA World Cup in Germany

See also

New Jersey County Colleges
WWFM (classical music radio station owned by MCCC)

References

External links
Official website
The College VOICE - student newspaper

Garden State Athletic Conference
New Jersey County Colleges
Two-year colleges in the United States
Universities and colleges in Mercer County, New Jersey
Educational institutions established in 1966
1966 establishments in New Jersey
NJCAA athletics